Samuel Peirson (c. 1647 - 1720) was an English organist.

Career
Peirson succeeded John Reading as Organist of Chichester Cathedral in October 1677. He was suspended for three months in 1711 for his public assertion that "the late King William was a pickpocket... he had no more religion than a dog!". It was during Peirson's tenure of office that Renatus Harris installed the Main Organ in the cathedral. He died in office at Chichester.

See also
Organs and organists of Chichester Cathedral

References

1640s births
1720 deaths
English classical organists
British male organists
Cathedral organists
Male classical organists